The Department of Communities, Housing and Digital Economy (CHDE), formerly the Department of Housing and Public Works, is a ministerial department within the Queensland Government, tasked with providing housing (including homelessness and building standards), sport, digital technology, and urban design and architecture services to Queensland individuals and businesses. HPW was also responsible for providing procurement, office space and digital services to Queensland Government departments (including 27 ongoing services through Queensland Shared Services).

Executive leadership and structure

Minister for Housing and Public Works 

HPW is overseen by its Minister, Hon Mick de Brenni, the member of the Queensland Legislative Assembly for Springwood. He represents the Australian Labor Party. In addition, he is also the Minister for Digital Technology and Minister for Sport, and has held these three ministerial roles since 12 December 2017. In his roles, the Minister is also responsible for: Stadiums Queensland, the Residential Tenancies Authority, the Queensland Building Construction Commission, the Board of Professional Engineers, and the Board of Architects.

Director-General 
The department is run day-to-day under the leadership of its Director-General, Liza Carrol. Having started the role of Director-General on 3 August 2015, Carrol formerly held the role of Associate Secretary (Head of Indigenous Affairs) for the Department of the Prime Minister and Cabinet, and before that, the Deputy Secretary for the Department of Families, Housing, Community Services and Indigenous Affairs. Carrol holds a Bachelor of Education and a Master of Education (Hons), majoring in Sociology. Carrol was also awarded the Public Service Medal for her work on the "Ahead of the Game: Blueprint for Reform in the Australian Public Service" project.

Leadership structure 
Under the Minister and the Director-General, HPW has three Deputy Directors-General (Housing, Homelessness and Sport; Building Policy and Asset Management; Portfolio Strategy), an Assistant Director-General, and the Chief Customer and Digital Officer, as well as a Transition Advisor. The Deputy Director-General (Portfolio Strategy) also operates as the Chief Advisor Queensland Government Procurement. The other two Deputy Directors-General (Housing, Homelessness and Sport; Building Policy and Asset Management) are also supported by their own Assistant Director-General.

Supporting agencies

Queensland Shared Services 
Queensland Shared Services (QSS) is an agency within HPW that provides whole-of-government support and services. QSS supports departments by operating public and internally facing services such as government human resources (including payroll), finance, procurement, telecommunications, and mail services. QSS provides services to 27 of the 29 Queensland Government departments, excluding only Education Queensland and Queensland Health. Resident-facing services, such as the 13 QGOV (13 74 68) phone number and the Queensland Government website, are managed by a division within QSS called Smart Service Queensland. QSS is part of the Queensland Government Consumer and Digital Group within HPW.

QFleet 
QFleet is the Queensland Government's vehicle fleet management agency, lying within HPW. QFleet provides vehicle procurement, sales, leasing, maintenance, safety, and policy services to Queensland Government departments, and government-funded entities such as statutory authorities, government owned corporations, some local governments, and some not-for-profit organisations.

Queensland State Archives 

The Queensland State Archives are the governance and culture archives of all of Queensland. Queensland State Archives is part of the Queensland Government Consumer and Digital Group within HPW.

Responsibilities

Housing and homelessness 
HPW, hinted by its name, is primarily responsible for housing and homelessness services throughout Queensland. They provide commercial renting and tenancy support, crisis accommodation and state housing services through the Queensland Government's Service Centres in Brisbane, Cairns and Maroochydore. In more regional areas, HPW provides their services through their own Housing Service Centres.

Public works 
Through internal agencies, like Queensland Shared Services and QFleet, HPW is also responsible for providing support to Queensland Government agencies, including procurement support.

Other 
HPW is also responsible for other elements of governance, often in collaboration with other departments, agencies, and authorities. These governing responsibilities include:

 sport and recreation
 building and plumbing
 digital services
urban design and architecture

Beyond this, HPW also administrative and consumer services to the Queensland Government. These services include Smart Service Queensland and the Queensland State Archives.

Legislation 
HPW is responsible for administrating various articles of state-wide legislation, and for supporting industries and individuals in complying with legislation. These include the:

 Housing Act 2003
Housing Regulations 2015
 Major Sport Facilities Act 2001
Major Sports Facilities Regulation 2014
 Mt. Gravatt Showgrounds Act 1988
 Sports Anti-Doping Act 2003
Plumbing and Drainage Act 2018
Plumbing and Drainage Regulation 2019
Housing Legislation (Building Better Futures) Amendment Act 2017

Housing Legislation (Building Better Futures) Amendment Act 2017 
The Housing Legislation (Building Better Futures) Amendment Act 2017 includes amendments to several acts, for which HPW is responsible for providing support to the relevant industries. The acts amended are:
Manufactured Homes (Residential Parks) Act 2003
Residential Services (Accreditation) Act 2002
Residential Services (Accreditation) Regulation 2018
Retirement Villages Act 1999
Residential Tenancies and Rooming Accommodation Act 2008

History

Before federation (pre-1901) 

 1862: The Lands and Works Department was created in 1862.
 1866: The Lands and Works Department was divided into the Lands Department and the Public Works Department.
 1887: The Public Works and Mines Departments merge.
 1890: The Public Works Department was established from the former Mines and Works Department.

1901–2000 

 1909: The early 20th century marks the Queensland Government's first involvement in housing when it introduces The Workers' Dwellings Act 1909 to provide subsidised housing for workers. The Workers' Dwelling Branch is established shortly after and is responsible for lending money and providing house construction expertise to Queenslanders.

 1920: The Workers' Dwellings Branch was transferred to the State Advances Corporation.
 1939: Staff from the Public Works Department are deployed to Townsville to assist with defence projects during World War II. As a result, the department becomes heavily involved in defence projects including the construction of the Garbutt Air Base, large warehouses at depots at Macrossan and Breddan, and a military hospital at Blackwater. The department was also involved in procuring and sending food supplies. The Department of Public Works' Townsville office becomes the epicentre for the department's work during World War II.
 1945: The Queensland Housing Commission was established following federal and state investment in post-war reconstruction.
 1947: To meet the demand for housing, the Queensland Housing Commission started building the State's first rental homes.
 1970: Due to changes to the Family Law Act, including the addition of no-fault divorce, and the subsequence rise of smaller households, the Commission began developing unit blocks and attached houses rather than standalone large estate developments.
 1975: The Public Works Department begins designing and developing the Queensland Cultural Centre

 1989: The Administrative Services Department is formed, encompassing the former Public Works Department.
 1992: The Department of Housing, Local Government and Planning is formed. Responsibility for the Aboriginal Rental Housing program transfers to the Queensland Department of Housing, Local Government and Planning.
 1996: The Department of Public Works and Housing is formed.
 1998: The Public Works and Housing Department separates into two portfolios, with Housing becoming its own department to streamline state housing efforts. The Smart Housing initiative and Community Renewal program.

21st century 

 2001: The department wins the Royal Australian Institute of Architects' Harry Marks Sustainable Architectural Award for the design of Redcliffe City Council library and gallery.
 2002: QFleet won the Australasian Fleet Managers Association (AFMA) 2002 Fleet Environment Award for its ongoing corporate fleet environment practices. QFleet also became the first organisation to receive all three of AFMA's major industry awards, also winning the Fleet Safety Award and later the Fleet Manager of the Year award. In the same year, the Department of Public Works was recognised for its heritage conservation efforts with a gold award, the John Herbert Heritage Award from the National Trust of Queensland for the restoration of the 173-year-old convict-built Commissariat Store in William Street, Brisbane.
 2005: The department assumes a leadership role for the Queensland Government's four-year Responding to Homelessness initiative after earlier leading work aimed at improving cross-agency responses to homelessness.
 2008: The department commences RentConnect, and becomes the Queensland conduit for the National Rental Affordability Scheme, a federal and state government initiative to stimulate the supply of 50,000 new affordable rental dwellings across Australia.
 2012: The Department of Housing and Public Works is formed from the previous departments of Housing and Public Works.

References

External links 
 
 Queensland Government website

Government departments of Queensland
Queensland